HMS Salmon was a  which served with the Royal Navy. She was launched in 1895, served in home waters and was sold off in 1911.

Operational details

In late 1901 Salmon was damaged in an accident, and temporarily repaired at Harwich by shipwrights from Sheerness Dockyard in December 1901. The following month she was paid off at Sheerness, and ordered into dry dock for repairs. She was refitted and had her decks strengthened, staying in the dockyard until December 1902, when she was placed in Fleet Reserve at Chatham.

Notes

Bibliography

 

 

Salmon-class destroyers
Ships built on the Humber
1895 ships
A-class destroyers (1913)